Mueang Nakhon Sawan is the capital district (amphoe mueang) of Nakhon Sawan province, in central Thailand.

Geography
Neighboring districts are (from the north clockwise) Banphot Phisai, Kao Liao, Chum Saeng, Tha Tako, Phayuha Khiri, Krok Phra, Lat Yao.

The main rivers of the district are the Nan and Ping, which meet in the town of Nakhon Sawan to form the Chao Phraya. In the eastern part of the district is the Bueng Boraphet swamp, the most important wetland of the province.

Administration

Central administration 
Mueang Nakhon Sawan is divided into 17 subdistricts (tambons), which are further subdivided into 172 administrative villages (mubans).

Local administration 
There is one city (Thesaban Nakhon) in the district:
 Nakhon Sawan consisting of subdistrict Pak Nam Pho and parts of subdistricts Khwae Yai, Nakhon Sawan Tok, Nakhon Sawan Ok, and Wat Sai.

There is one subdistrict municipality (thesaban tambon) in the district:
 Nong Ben consisting of parts of subdistricts Nong Krot and Nong Kradon.

There are 16 subdistrict administrative organizations (SAO) in the district:
 Klang Daet consisting of subdistrict Klang Daet.
 Kriangkrai consisting of subdistrict Kriangkrai.
 Khwae Yai consisting of parts of subdistrict Khwae Yai.
 Takhian Luean consisting of subdistrict Takhian Luean.
 Nakhon Sawan Tok consisting of parts of subdistrict Nakhon Sawan Tok.
 Nakhon Sawan Ok consisting of parts of subdistrict Nakhon Sawan Ok.
 Bang Phra Luang consisting of subdistrict Bang Phra Luang.
 Bang Muang consisting of subdistrict Bang Muang.
 Ban Makluea consisting of subdistrict Ban Makluea.
 Ban Kaeng consisting of subdistrict Ban Kaeng.
 Phra Non consisting of subdistrict Phra Non.
 Wat Sai consisting of parts of subdistrict Wat Sai.
 Nong Krot consisting of parts of subdistrict Nong Krot.
 Nong Kradon consisting of parts of subdistrict Nong Kradon.
 Nong Pling consisting of subdistrict Nong Pling.
 Bueng Senat consisting of subdistrict Bueng Senat.

References

External links
amphoe.com (Thai)

Mueang Nakhon Sawan